Zhang Wei (born 22 December 1989) is a Chinese goalball player. She won a silver medal at the 2016 Summer Paralympics.

At age 6, she experienced loss of vision and was diagnosed with optic neuropathy. She began playing goalball in 2008, after participating in track and field for a few years. She discontinued running because she could not find a permanent sighted guide. She missed the 2012 Summer Paralympics due to a rotator cuff tear.

References

Female goalball players
1989 births
Living people
Sportspeople from Jiangsu
People from Jingjiang
Paralympic goalball players of China
Paralympic silver medalists for China
Goalball players at the 2016 Summer Paralympics
Medalists at the 2016 Summer Paralympics
Paralympic medalists in goalball
Nanjing University of Chinese Medicine alumni
Goalball players at the 2020 Summer Paralympics
21st-century Chinese women